Aigialus grandis is a fungus species of the genus of Aigialus. Aigialus grandis occurs in tropical and subtropical environments.

References

Further reading

 
 

Fungi described in 1986